Ctesibius is a small lunar impact crater that is located near the equator, on the far side of the Moon. It is named after the ancient Greek-Egyptian inventor Ctesibius. It lies between the larger crater Abul Wáfa to the west and the slightly smaller Heron to the east.

The outer wall of Ctesibius is wide and sharp-edged, with little erosion. A low ridge is attached to the southern rim, and curves to the south-southeast. At the center of the relatively flat interior is a low ridge. Faint traces of ray material lies across the western floor and rim from Necho to the southeast.

References

External links

Ctesibius at The Moon Wiki

Impact craters on the Moon